The RENESIS Player is a SVG compatible viewer and renderer, which was distributed by examotion GmbH (Insolvency since June 2010). It runs on the Windows platform.

The player passed 58.73% of all test in the official World Wide Web Consortium test suite.

References

Graphics libraries
Scalable Vector Graphics